The 2018–2019 Israel Football League season was the 12th season of the Israel Football League. The season began on November 15, 2018 and concluded on February 28, 2019 with IsraBowl XII. This season was the first to feature full eleven-man games after previously playing nine-man football. The season also marked the return of the Ramat HaSharon Hammers, who were on hiatus during the 2017–2018 season.

The Jerusalem Lions defeated the Petah Tikva Troopers in IsraBowl XII to secure their third straight championship.

Regular season

References 

Israel Football League Seasons